Aphrodisias was a town of ancient Thrace on the Thracian Chersonese, inhabited during Hellenistic, Roman, and Byzantine times. During Roman times, it received a Roman colony under the name of Colonia Flaviopolis.

Its site is located on the Gallipoli Peninsula in European Turkey.

References

Populated places in ancient Thrace
Former populated places in Turkey
Roman towns and cities in Turkey
Populated places of the Byzantine Empire
History of Çanakkale Province
Coloniae (Roman)